Sarah Liguori (born 1983) is an American politician who served as a member of the Arizona House of Representatives from the 28th legislative district from 2021 to 2023. She was appointed to the seat after incumbent Representative Aaron Lieberman resigned to run for Governor. She is a member of the Democratic Party.

Liguori was born in Tucson, and went to the University of Arizona, in addition to studying international business at the Lorenzo di Medici University in Florence, Italy.

2022 Arizona legislature campaign 
In 2022, Liguori launched a campaign to keep her seat in the Arizona House of Representatives, competing for one of two seats representing the state's 5th legislative district. Liguori's campaign was endorsed by Planned Parenthood Advocates of Arizona, alongside Arizona Democratic Party Vice Chair Brianna Westbrook, who is also competing for a seat in the same legislature and district. She lost reelection.

References

External links
 Official page at the Arizona State Legislature
 Campaign site
 Biography at Ballotpedia

21st-century American women politicians
Living people
Democratic Party members of the Arizona House of Representatives
Politicians from Tucson, Arizona
University of Arizona alumni
Women state legislators in Arizona
21st-century American politicians
1983 births